The Shire of Pittsworth was a local government area in the Darling Downs region of Queensland, Australia, about  southwest of the regional city of Toowoomba.

History
The Shire of Pittsworth came into existence on 24 April 1913 after its residents voted to split away from the Shire of Jondaryan. It held its first meeting on 9 July 1913 at which W.P. Copp was elected chairman by 5 votes to 4. A new hall and council office was built for £766 in 1914, but in 1956 the council relocated to the new Civic Centre in Yandilla Street, Pittsworth, consisting of a Town Hall and Shire Chambers. Pittsworth was an undivided council and elected a mayor and six councillors.

On 15 March 2008, under the Local Government (Reform Implementation) Act 2007 passed by the Parliament of Queensland on 10 August 2007, the Shire of Pittsworth merged with the City of Toowoomba and the Shires of Cambooya, Clifton, Crows Nest, Jondaryan, Millmerran and Shire of Rosalie to form the Toowoomba Region.

Towns and localities
The Shire of Pittsworth includes the following settlements:

 Pittsworth
 Biddeston
 Bongeen
 Branchview
 Brookstead
 Broxburn
 Felton
 Irongate
 Kincora
 Linthorpe
 Mount Tyson

 Nangwee
 North Branch
 Norwin
 Rossvale
 Scrubby Mountain
 Southbrook
 Springside
 St Helens
 Stoneleigh
 Yarranlea

Population

Chairmen and Mayors
The leaders of the shire are listed below.

Chairmen
 1913–15: William Perham Copp
 1915–17: Jacob Bickerton
 1917–18: William Sullivan
 1918–21: Arthur Carl Krieg
 1921–23: Jacob Bickerton
 1923: Jonas Holmes
 1923–36: Arthur Carl Krieg
 1936–39: William Lee-Archer
 1939–46: Arthur Carl Krieg
 1946–49: William Lee-Archer
 1949–57: Sir Alan Roy Fletcher
 1957–67: Leslie Joppich
 1967–85: Ross Thomas Stirling
 1985–94: Lawrence Dudley Stallman

Mayors
 1994–98: W J Drummond
 1998–2008: Ros S Scotney

References

External links
 

Former local government areas of Queensland
Darling Downs
Toowoomba Region
2008 disestablishments in Australia
Populated places disestablished in 2008